Belarus Red, also known as Byelorussian Red, Krasnaya belorusskaya, and Krasnobelorusskaya, is a Belarusan dairy cattle breed.

The breed has been improved by crossing with Angeln Red, German Red, Polish Red, Danish Red, Estonian Red, and Latvian Brown. They are common in Belarus, mostly around Grodno and Minsk. They are noted for their longevity and undemanding feeding requirements.

External links 
 http://www.ansi.okstate.edu/breeds/cattle/belarusred/
 http://www.cnshb.ru/AKDiL/0044/base/k0030012.shtm

Dairy cattle breeds
Cattle breeds originating in Belarus
Animal breeds originating in the Soviet Union
Cattle breeds